This is a list of territorial governors in the 15th century (1401–1500) AD, such as the administrators of colonies, protectorates, or other dependencies. Where applicable, native rulers are also listed.

A dependent territory is normally a territory that does not possess full political independence or sovereignty as a sovereign state yet remains politically outside of the controlling state's integral area. The administrators of uninhabited territories are excluded.

England
Kingdom of England English overseas possessions
Monarchs

Guernsey, Crown dependency
British monarchs are the Dukes of Normandy
Governors
Edward of Norwich, in appanage, Governor (1415)
John of Lancaster, Governor (1430)
Humphrey, Duke of Gloucester, Governor (1435)
Henry Beauchamp, Governor (1446)
William Bertram and Nicholas Hault, Governors (1447)
John Nanfan, Governor (1453)
Geffrey Wallifly, Governor (1470)
John Tichefilde, Governor (1482)
Duarte Brandão, Governor (1482–1485)
Edward Weston, Governor (1486–1509)
John Avril, Governor (1488)
William Weston, Governor
Bailiffs
Gervais de Clermont, Bailiff (1387–1411)
James Cocquerel, Bailiff (1412–1432)
Thomas de la Court, Bailiff (1433–1445)
John Henry, Bailiff (1446–1447)
Guillaume Cartier, Bailiff (1447–1465)
Thomas de la Court, Bailiff (1466–1469)
Pierre de Beauvoir, Bailiff (1470–1479)
Edmund de Cheney, Bailiff (1480–1481)
Nicholas Fouaschin, Bailiff (1481–1482)
John Blondel, Bailiff (1483–1498)
John Martin, Bailiff (1499–1510)

Lordship of Ireland, a papal fief of England 
English monarchs are the Lords of Ireland
Lords Deputy of Ireland
 Sir John Stanley: 1399–1402 (second term)
 Thomas of Lancaster, 1st Duke of Clarence: 1402–1405 (aged 13)
 James Butler, 3rd Earl of Ormond: 1405
 Gerald FitzGerald, 5th Earl of Kildare: 1405–1408
 Thomas of Lancaster, 1st Duke of Clarence: 1408–1413
 Sir John Stanley: 1413–1414 (third term)
 Archbishop of Dublin: 1414
 John Talbot, 1st Earl of Shrewsbury: 1414–1421 (first term)
 James Butler, 4th Earl of Ormond: 1419–1421 (first term)
 Edmund Mortimer, 5th Earl of March: 1423–1425
 John Talbot, 1st Earl of Shrewsbury: 1425  (second term)
 James Butler, 4th Earl of Ormond: 1425–1427
 Sir John Grey: 1427–1428
 John Sutton, later 1st Lord Dudley: 1428–1429
 Sir Thomas le Strange: 1429–1431
 Thomas Stanley, 1st Baron Stanley: 1431–1436
 Lionel de Welles, 6th Baron Welles: 1438–1446
 John Talbot, 1st Earl of Shrewsbury: 1446 (third term)
 Richard Plantagenet, Duke of York: 1447–1460 (Lord Deputy:Thomas FitzGerald, 7th Earl of Kildare)
 George Plantagenet, Duke of Clarence: 1462–1478 (Lords Deputy:Thomas FitzGerald, 7th Earl of Desmond/Thomas FitzGerald, 7th Earl of Kildare)
 John de la Pole, 2nd Duke of Suffolk: 1478
 Richard of Shrewsbury, Duke of York: 1478–1483 (aged 5. Lord Deputy:Gerald FitzGerald, 8th Earl of Kildare)
 Edward of Middleham: 1483–1484 (aged 11. Lord Deputy:Gerald FitzGerald, 8th Earl of Kildare)
 John de la Pole, Earl of Lincoln: 1484–1485
 Jasper Tudor, 1st Duke of Bedford| 1485–1494 (Lord Deputy:Gerald FitzGerald, 8th Earl of Kildare)
 Henry, Duke of York: 1494–?1519 (Aged 4. Lords Deputy: Sir Edward Poynings/Gerald FitzGerald, 8th Earl of Kildare/Gerald FitzGerald, 9th Earl of Kildare)

Portugal
Kingdom of Portugal Portuguese colonial empire
Monarchs

Portuguese Cape Verde
Pêro Lourenço, Corregedor (1481–?)

Santiago	
Captains
Diogo Afonso, Captain (1462–1473)
Rodrigo Afonso, Captain (1473–1505)
Ribeira Grande
Captains
Antonio de Noli, Captain (1462–1496)
Branca de Aguiar, Captain (1497–?)
Boa Vista	
Rodrigo Afonso, Captain (1497–1505)
Alcatrazes Islands	
João de Santarém, Captain (1484–?)

Portuguese São Tomé
Captains, Governors
João de Paiva, Captain (1485–1490)
João Pereira, Captain (1490–1493)
Álvaro de Caminha, Captain (1493–1499)
Fernão de Melo, Captain (1499–c.1510)

Portuguese Tangier
Governors
Rodrigo Afonso de Melo, Governor (1471–1484?)
Manuel de Melo, Governor (1484?–1486)
João de Meneses, Governor (1486–1489)
Fernão Martins Mascarenhas, Interim Governor (1487–1489)
Manuel Pessanha, Interim Governor (1489–1490)
Lopo Vaz de Azevedo, Governor (1490?–1501)

Mexico
Tlacala Federation
Xicotencatl I (1425-1522), tlatoani of Tizatlan

Aztec Empire
Cuauhnahuac
Miquiuix, Tlatoani (ruler or governor) (1398-1433)
Cuauhtototzin, Tlatoani (1433-?)
Tehuehuetzin,  Tlatoani (before 1491-1504)
Teotlatzinco
Tochihuitzin coyolchiuhqui, (late 14th-mid 15th centuries) Tlatoani and poet, son of Itzcoatl
Tepechpan
Cuacuauhtzin, Tlatoani and poet (c. 1410-1443)
Texcoco (altepetl) 
Nezahualcoyotl (tlatoani), architect, and poet (1402-1472)
Nezahualpilli, tlatoani and poet (1464-1515)
Cacamatzin, tlatoani and poet (1494-1520)

References

Territorial governors
-15th century
Territorial governors
 Territorial governors